In a Broadway Bag (Mame) is an album by American singer Bobby Darin, released in 1966.

The album consists of songs from then-current hit Broadway musicals, including Funny Girl, How to Succeed in Business Without Really Trying, Mame, The Roar of the Greasepaint, the Smell of the Crowd, and others.

In a Broadway Bag (Mame) was reissued on CD in 2007 along with Bobby Darin Sings The Shadow of Your Smile.

Reception

In his Allmusic review, critic JT Griffith wrote "The Shadow of Your Smile began the second highly successful period in the artist's career, after the "Splish Splash" and "Mack the Knife" days. In a Broadway Bag continued that success, and "Mame" was his biggest hit in three years. In a Broadway Bag is generally considered one of Bobby Darin's best (and certainly most cohesive) LPs."

Track listing

Side one
"Mame" (Jerry Herman) – 2:13
"I Believe in You" (Frank Loesser) – 3:49
"It's Today" (Herman) – 2:05
"Everybody Has the Right to Be Wrong" (Sammy Cahn, Jimmy Van Heusen) – 2:36
"Feeling Good" (Leslie Bricusse, Anthony Newley) – 2:45
"Don't Rain on My Parade" (Bob Merrill, Jule Styne) – 2:54

Side two
"The Other Half of Me" (Stan Freeman, Jack Lawrence) – 2:26
"Once Upon a Time" (Lee Adams, Charles Strouse) – 3:05
"Try to Remember" (Tom Jones, Harvey Schmidt) – 3:08
"I'll Only Miss Her When I Think of Her" (Cahn, Van Heusen) – 2:32
"Night Song" (Adams, Strouse) – 2:56

Personnel
Bobby Darin – vocals

References

1966 albums
Bobby Darin albums
Atlantic Records albums